Annapolis is the capital of the U.S. state of Maryland.

Annapolis may also refer to:

Places

United States
Annapolis, Maryland
The United States Naval Academy, in Annapolis, Maryland
Annapolis Junction, Maryland, an unincorporated community in Howard County
Annapolis, California, an unincorporated locality in Sonoma County
Annapolis, Illinois, an unincorporated community in Crawford County
Annapolis, Indiana, an unincorporated community in Parke County
Annapolis, Missouri, a town Iron County
Annapolis, Ohio, an unincorporated community in Jefferson County

Canada
Annapolis (electoral district), a defunct federal electoral district in Nova Scotia
Annapolis (provincial electoral district), a current provincial electoral district in Nova Scotia
Annapolis County, Nova Scotia, a county in the province of Nova Scotia
Annapolis Royal, Nova Scotia, a town in Annapolis county
Annapolis Valley, spanning Annapolis, Digby and Kings county; containing the Annapolis River

Brazil 
Anápolis, a city in Goiás

Films
Annapolis (1928 film), a 1928 silent film drama
Annapolis (2006 film), set at the US Naval Academy

Events and organizations
Annapolis Conference, a Middle East peace conference held in 2007
Annapolis Convention (1774–1776), the Revolutionary War government of Maryland
Annapolis Convention (1786), which led to the Philadelphia Constitutional Convention of 1787

Vessels
, any one of four ships of the U.S. Navy named for Annapolis, Maryland, most recently the Los Angeles-class submarine USS Annapolis
, a class of helicopter destroyers in Royal Canadian Navy service
The commercial trawler Annapolis, built in 1937, which became the

Other uses
 Annapolis, a genus of spiders, with the sole species Annapolis mossi
 Annapolis (horse), an American thoroughbred horse
 NSS Annapolis, a transmitter station operated by the US Navy